New from the Big City is an album by pianist Les McCann released on the Pacific Jazz label in 1970.

Track listing 
All compositions by Les McCann except as indicated
 "Gus Gus" – 2:45
 "Big City" (Marvin Jenkins) – 3:08
 "Come Back Baby" (Ray Charles) – 2:56
 "Steady Trompin'" – 4:35
 "Bill Bailey Won't You Please Come Home" (Traditional) – 4:45 
 "The Girl from Ipanema" (Antônio Carlos Jobim, Vinicius de Moraes, Norman Gimbel) – 2:55
 "Tenderly" (Jack Lawrence, Walter Gross) – 6:05
 "Beaux J. Poo Boo" – 8:10
 "Kathleen's Theme" – 2:40

Personnel 
Les McCann – piano, vocals
Herbie Lewis – bass
Ron Jefferson – drums

References 

Les McCann live albums
1970 live albums
Pacific Jazz Records live albums